William Theodore de Bary (August 9, 1919 – July 14, 2017) was an American Sinologist and scholar of East Asian philosophy who was a professor and administrator at Columbia University for nearly 70 years.

De Bary graduated from Columbia College in 1941, where he was a student in the first year of Columbia's famed Literature Humanities course. He then briefly took up graduate studies at Harvard University before leaving to serve in American military intelligence in the Pacific Theatre of World War Two. Upon his return, he resumed his studies at Columbia, where he completed his Ph.D. in 1953.

In order to create text books for the non-Western version of the Columbia humanities course, he drew together teams of scholars to translate original source material, Sources of Chinese Tradition (1960), Sources of Japanese Tradition, and Sources of Indian Tradition. His extensive publications made the case for the universality of Asian values and a tradition of democratic values in Confucianism. He is recognized as training the graduate students and mentoring the scholars who created the field of Neo-Confucian studies.

Life and career
William Theodore "Ted" de Bary was born on August 9, 1919, in The Bronx, New York, and grew up in Leonia, New Jersey.  De Bary's great-uncle was the German surgeon and botanist Anton de Bary, and his father William de Bary (1882–1963) immigrated to the U.S. from Germany in 1914.  His parents divorced when he was a small child, and his mother raised him as a single mother. He formally changed his first name to "Wm." to distinguish himself from his father. He entered Columbia University as an undergraduate student in 1937, and began studying Chinese the following year as a sophomore.   After graduating in 1941, de Bary began graduate study in Chinese at Harvard University, but the following year he was recruited by the U.S. Navy to undergo intensive training in Japanese and serve as an intelligence officer in the Pacific Theatre of World War II.

In 1947, de Bary left the military and returned to Columbia for graduate study in Chinese.  He received an M.A. in 1948 followed by a Ph.D. in 1953 with a dissertation entitled "A Plan for the Prince: the Ming-i tai-fang lu of Huang Tsung-hsi", and became a professor immediately afterward.  De Bary was active in faculty intervention during the Columbia University protests of 1968 and served as the university's provost from 1971 to 1978. He has attempted to reshape the Core Curriculum of Columbia College to include Great Books and classes devoted to non-Western civilizations. De Bary was additionally famous for rarely missing a Columbia Lions football game since he began teaching at the university in 1953. A recognized educator, he won Columbia's Great Teacher Award in 1969, its Lionel Trilling Book Award in 1983 and its Mark Van Doren Award for Great Teaching in 1987. In 2010 he received the Philolexian Award for Distinguished Literary Achievement.

De Bary served as the director of the Heyman Center for the Humanities and continued teaching until several months before his death in 2017 at age 97.

Prizes and honours
 Watumull Prize of the American Historical Association in 1958
 Fishburn Prize of Educational Press Association in 1964
 Elected to the American Academy of Arts and Sciences, 1974
 Edwin O. Reischauer Lectures 1986
 Elected to the American Philosophical Association, 1999
 Elevated to the Order of the Rising Sun (Third Class),
 Philolexian Award for Distinguished Literary Achievement, 2010
 National Humanities Medal, 2013
 Tang Prize in Sinology, 2016

Honorary degrees
 St. Lawrence University, D.Litt., 1968
 Loyola University of Chicago, LHD, 1970
 Columbia University. D.Litt., 1994

Major works

Original works
 The Great Civilized Conversation: Education for a World Community (CUP, 2013)
 Self and Society in Ming Thought (ACLS Humanities E-Book, 2011)
 Living Legacies at Columbia (CUP, 2006)
 Nobility and Civility: Asian Ideals of Leadership and the Common Good, (Harvard UP, 2004)
 Asian Values and Human Rights: A Confucian Communitarian Perspective. Harvard UP (2000)
 Learning for One's Self: Essays on the Individual in Neo-Confucian Thought (CUP, 1991)
 The Trouble with Confucianism, (Harvard UP, 1991)
 Eastern canons: Approaches to the Asian Classics (CUP, 1990)
 Message of the mind in Neo-Confucianism (CUP, 1989)
 Neo-Confucian Education: the Formative Stage (University of California Press, 1989)
 East Asian Civilizations: a Dialogue in Five Stages, (Harvard UP, 1988)
 The Rise of Neo-Confucianism in Korea (1985)
 The Liberal Tradition in China  (Chinese University of Hong Kong Press, 1983)
 Yüan thought: Chinese Thought and Religion under the Mongols (CUP, 1982)
 Neo-Confucian Orthodoxy and the Learning of the Mind-And-Heart (CUP, 1981)
 Principle and Practicality: Essays in Neo-Confucianism and Practical Learning (CUP, 1979)
 Unfolding of Neo-Confucianism (CUP, 1975)
 Self and Society in Ming Thought (CUP, 1970)
 The Buddhist Tradition in India, China and Japan (Random House, 1969)
 Approaches to Asian Civilizations (CUP, 1964)
 Guide to Oriental Classics (CUP, 1964) end ed. 1975. 3rd ed. 1988

Original translations
 Waiting for the Dawn: a Plan for the Prince (1993)
 Five Women who Loved Love (Tuttle, 1956)

Edited volumes
 Finding Wisdom in East Asian Classics (CUP, 2011)
 Sources of East Asian Tradition. 2 vols [vol. 1 published subtitled Premodern Asia; vol 2 subtitled The modern Period (CUP, 2008)
 Sources of Korean Tradition: Volume 1 (Harvard UP, 1997) 2nd ed. 2001
 Confucianism and Human Rights (CUP, 1998) with Tu Weiming
 Sources of Japanese Tradition (1958), with Ryūsaku Tsunoda and Donald Keene 2nd ed published as earliest times to 1600 (2001) with Donald Keene, George Tanabe, Paul Varley vol 2 published as 1600 to 2000 with Carol Gluck and Arthur Tiedemann (2005)
 Sources of Chinese Tradition: Volume 1 (CUP, 1960) expanded 2 vols ed. Columbia UP, 1999 and 2000
 Approaches to the Oriental Classics: Asian Literature and Thought in General Education (1958/9)
 Sources of Indian Tradition, 2 vols (1957 and 1964), with Stephen N. Hay and I. H. Qureshi 2nd ed. 1988

Notes

References and further reading

 In Memoriam: Wm. Theodore de Bary (1919-2017)
 De Bary, Wm. Theodore, interviewed by Gordon J. Slovut. "Reminiscences of William Theodore De Bary." Columbia Crisis of 1968 Project. 1968. Columbia University Library.

External links
 Oral history interview transcript with William De Bary on 27 May 1997, American Institute of Physics, Niels Bohr Library & Archives
 Your Columbians: William Theodore de Bary
 William De Bary Obituary – The Journal News

1919 births
2017 deaths
Writers from the Bronx
Military personnel from New York City
Columbia College (New York) alumni
Columbia Graduate School of Arts and Sciences alumni
Columbia University faculty
Harvard University alumni
New Confucian philosophers
Presidents of the Association for Asian Studies
National Humanities Medal recipients
Recipients of the Order of the Rising Sun, 3rd class
American sinologists
People from Leonia, New Jersey
American people of German descent
Members of the American Philosophical Society